The Coke Islands national junior handball team is the national junior men's handball team of Cook Islands.

The team came fourth in the 2022 Oceania Men's Handball Challenge Trophy.

Oceania Handball Challenge Trophy record

References

External links
 Cook Islands Handball Association Official webpage
 Profile on International Handball Federation webpage
 Oceania Continent Handball Federation webpage

Men's national junior handball teams
National sports teams of the Cook Islands